The 1971 Castrol Trophy was an endurance race for Group E Series Production Touring Cars. The event, which was staged at the Warwick Farm circuit in New South Wales, Australia on 2 May 1971, was Round 2 of the 1971 Australian Manufacturers' Championship.

Classes
As the race was an Australian Manufacturers’ Championship round, the field was divided into five classes, based on “CP Units”. The engine capacity, in litres, was multiplied by the retail price, in Australian Dollars, to arrive at a CP Unit value for each competing model.
 Class A : 0 to 3000 CP Units
 Class B : 3001 - 4600 CP Units
 Class C : 4601 - 9000 CP Units
 Class D : 9001 - 18000 CP Units
 Class E : Over 18000 CP Units

Results

The winner's race time for the 100 lap, 225 mile race was 3 hours 6 minutes 29.5 seconds.

From the 30 entries for the race, 28 cars started, with seven failing to finish.

Notes and references

Further reading
 Australian Title Conditions, CAMS Manual of Motor Sport, 1971, page 82
 Holden, The Official Racing History, 1988, page 333

External links
 Image of the field in the opening lap of the race
 Image of the winning car, driven by Colin Bond
 Image of the second placed car, driven by Peter Brock

Australian Manufacturers' Championship
Castrol Trophy
Motorsport at Warwick Farm